Leucine-rich repeat-containing protein 17 is a protein that in humans is encoded by the LRRC17 gene.

References

Further reading

External links
 
 

LRR proteins